Magnolia × alba, also known as the white champaca, white sandalwood, or white jade orchid tree, is a flowering plant of hybrid origin that is commonly cultivated in Southeast Asia and tropical regions of East Asia. Although the exact origin is uncertain, it is considered to be a hybrid of Magnolia champaca and Magnolia montana.

Names
The current name of the white champaca is derived from its local name in Indonesian, Cempaka Putih.

The white champaca is known by various names in English including pak lan in Hawaii like Cantonese transcription of 白蘭. Horticultural trade names used in the United States include the taxonomic synonym Michelia alba to fanciful ones such as 'white fragrant himalayan champaca'.

Names in other languages include kantil in Javanese.

In Taiwan, the tree and specifically the flower, is known as 玉蘭花 (yü lan hua).

Description
Magnolia × alba matures to 30 meters with evergreen leaves; the flowers have a count of 12 tepals.

Uses
Magnolia × alba is widely cultivated as an ornamental in Asia, particularly tropical and subtropical regions of China and Southeast Asia for the strongly fragrant flowers.

In Taiwan, the flowers are plucked from trees before they open and bunches of them are strung together on wire, to be sold at roadside to truck and taxi drivers. The flowers remain fragrant for several days, before wilting and being disposed of.

In Indonesia, the pleasantly fragrant flower is used and arranged together with Jasminum sambac as flower garland, especially wore by brides during traditional wedding ceremony.  The flowers are similarly used in Thailand, where they are worn as traditional wedding garlands by the bride and groom.

An essential oil is extracted from the flowers. In China, where it is known as bai lan (白蘭), the flowers are used to prepare yulan tea. In traditional Chinese medicine, the flowers are used to move qi and relieve cough.

Gallery

References

External links

 Magnolia classification from the Magnolia Society.

Garden plants of Asia
Ornamental trees
alba
Hybrid plants